The Netherlands Antilles sent 99 athletes (75 males, 24 females) to the XXIst Central American and Caribbean Games in Mayagüez, Puerto Rico, July 17 - August 1, 2010.

The athletes participated in athletics (6), baseball (20), bowling (3), boxing (1), (field) hockey (16), judo (3), karate do (3), sailing (6), shooting (6), softball (17), swimming (3), and water polo (13).

Medalists

Gold

Silver
Rodion Davelaar, Swimming (Men's 50 Breast)

Bronze

Results by event

Athletics

Baseball

Bowling

Boxing

Hockey

Judo

Karate Do

Sailing

Shooting

Softball

Swimming

Hycinth Cijntje (m)
Rodion Davelaar (m)
Silvie Ketelaars (f)

Water Polo

References

External links

Nations at the 2010 Central American and Caribbean Games
2010
Central American and Caribbean Games